During the 1999–2000 English football season, Crystal Palace F.C. competed in the Football League First Division.

Season summary
Crystal Palace finished in a secure 15th final place. At the end of the season, veteran defender Andy Linighan was voted the club's player of the season.

Final league table

Results
Crystal Palace's score comes first

Legend

Football League First Division

FA Cup

League Cup

Players

First-team squad
Squad at end of season

Left club during season

References

Notes

Crystal Palace F.C. seasons
Crystal Palace F.C.